Crossotus nebulosus is a species of beetle in the family Cerambycidae. It was described by Fairmaire in 1892.

References

nebulosus
Beetles described in 1892